Annaluise & Anton is a 1999 German family film based on the eponymous children's book by Erich Kästner. A previous version Anna Louise and Anton was made in 1953.

Cast 
  - Annaluise
  - Anton
 Juliane Köhler - Bettina Pogge
 August Zirner - Richard Pogge
 Meret Becker - Elli Gast
 Sylvie Testud - Laurence
  - Dicke Bertha
 Benno Fürmann - Carlos

References

External links 

1999 films
German children's films
Films based on works by Erich Kästner
Films based on children's books
Films based on German novels
Remakes of German films
Films directed by Caroline Link
1990s German films